Dangni Station is a subway station of Busan Metro Line 1 located in Saha-gu, Busan, South Korea.

History
June 23, 1994: Opening

External links
 Cyber station information from Busan Transportation Corporation

Railway stations opened in 1994
Busan Metro stations
Saha District
1994 establishments in South Korea
20th-century architecture in South Korea